Nothing Gold Can Stay is a 2017 Chinese television series directed by Ding Hei and starring Sun Li and Chen Xiao. The series aired on Dragon TV and Jiangsu TV from 30 August 2017 to 8 October 2017.

Background
The series is an original script based on the real-life story of Widow An Wu (安吴寡妇), who was known as the god-daughter of Empress Dowager Cixi.

Synopsis
Zhou Ying is sold to the powerful Shen family by her foster father, yet successfully escapes her childish and bratty master Shen Xingyi by sneaking into merchant Wu Pin's palanquin. After a failed business collaboration that resulted in Shen Yuesheng's (Xingyi's older brother) death, the Shen family suspects that Wu Pin was the culprit behind Yuesheng's death. Xingyi then injures Wu Pin by using a club to hit his forehead multiple times, causing Wu Pin to fall into a coma. After the bride-to-be's father has a last-minute change of heart, Zhou Ying is married to Wu Pin in an effort to dispel bad luck. Miraculously, Wu Pin wakes up on the same night, and the couple share a happy few months together. Wu Weiwen, the patriarch of the family also agrees to educate her in the matters of commerce after witnessing her remarkable business acumen.

Unfortunately, Wu Pin is poisoned to death after getting too close to the truth of the failed business collaboration, and Wu Weiwen's imprisonment and death a couple of months later leaves the entire household in disarray. Zhou Ying is determined to turn around their fortune by investing in a cloth factory in Shaanxi. She gains the trust of the Wu family and starts from scratch. Meanwhile, Shen Xingyi has also decided to turn over a new leaf, and starts anew in Shanghai. Shen Xingyi's love for Zhou Ying is initially unrequited, though she eventually acknowledges that she has developed romantic feelings for him. However, romantic affections become of little importance in the face of political upheaval and personal revenge – Shen Xingyi joins the anti-Qing reformist movement and plots to kill the Empress Dowager Cixi while Zhou Ying avenges Wu Pin and her father-in-law's deaths by taking Shen Sihai and Du Mingli head on. After much struggle, Zhou Ying ultimately establishes a business empire, and also lends Empress Dowager Cixi a helping hand when she escapes to Jingyang.

Cast

Main

 Sun Li as Zhou Ying (周莹)
 A budding businesswoman who initially marries into the Wu Family to ward off bad luck. After her husband dies, she takes on his responsibilities and starts rebuilding their business empire from scratch.
 Chen Xiao as Shen Xingyi (沈星移)
 A happy-go-lucky young master who has never known hardship in his life. After meeting Zhou Ying, he eventually decides to change his ways, becoming an educated businessman and later an advocate for modernization who is willing to die to protect his country and loved ones.
 Peter Ho as Wu Pin (吴聘)
 Young master of the eastern courtyard in the Wu household, a kind and gentle businessman who is the first person to treat Zhou Ying for who she is, and respect her opinions.
 Ren Zhong as Zhao Baishi (赵白石)
 An upright and conservative county magistrate who remains loyal to his people. He has an unrequited love for Zhou Ying.
 Myolie Wu as Hu Yongmei (胡咏梅)
 The only daughter of the Hu family. She was betrothed to Wu Pin, but the marriage didn't go through due to Du Mingli's meddling. Hu Yongmei has a deep hatred towards Zhou Ying, believing that Zhou Ying forced her father to his death for his part in the failed business collaboration.
 Yu Haoming as Du Mingli (杜明礼)
 The main antagonist. He is an unscrupulous political schemer who serves Zaiyi, an anti-foreign politician and royal prince. He has business ambitions but lacks skill. He also has a twisted love for Hu Yongmei after she gave him food when he was a young beggar on the streets.

Supporting

Shen family

 Tang Qun as Lady Li
 Shen Sihai's mother.
 Tse Kwan-ho as Shen Sihai (沈四海)
 Shen Xingyi's father. One of the two pillars of the Jingyang business enterprise. He is a puppet of Du Mingli.
 Liu Jie as Wife of Shen Sihai
 Mother of Shen Yuesheng and Shen Xingyi.
 Li Jie as Shen Yuesheng (沈月生)
 Shen Xingyi's older brother.
 Wang Luyun as Linglong (玲珑)
 Shen Xingyi's maidservant.

Wu family

 Chang Chen-kuang as Wu Weiwen (吴蔚文)
 Patriarch of the Wu family's eastern courtyard. He is a capable and upright businessman who saw the potential in Zhou Ying, and defies all odds to groom her into a talented businesswoman.
 Mimi Kung as Lady Zheng (郑氏)
 Wife of Wu Weiwen, and mother of Wu Pin. Being the only surviving member of the eastern courtyard, she later treats Zhou Ying as her biological daughter after Zhou Ying helps the family through thick and thin.
 Han Yuanqi, Han Peizhen as Wu Yucheng (吴玉成), Wu Huaixian (吴怀先) (courtesy name Nianxi 念昔)
 Zhou Ying's adopted son, originally from the central courtyard.
 Hou Changrong as Wu Weiwu (吴蔚武)
 Head of the western courtyard, father of Wu Ze and Wu Yi. He partners with Zhou Ying and helps her revive the family business.
 Zhang Tianyang as Wu Ze (吴泽)
 Young master of the western courtyard, father of Wu Yusheng and Wu Yutong. He is seen as a rival to Wu Pin, but only wants to focus on his studies and become a scholar. He later joins the Hundred Days' Reform.
 Ceng Qi as Wu Yi (吴漪)
 Young mistress of the western courtyard. Despite her status quo, she craves freedom and equality in her heart.
 Tian Xiaobing as Wu Weishuang (吴蔚双)
 Head of the southern courtyard, father of Wu Yu.
 Wan Meixi as Liu Wan'er (柳婉儿)
 Wife of Wu Weishuang, and mother of Wu Yu. A greedy and despicable woman who receives due comeuppance for her crimes.
 Xu Nuo as Wu Yu (吴遇)
 Young master of the southern courtyard. A talented young man who leaves the Wu family after his parents' deaths.
 Tan Xihe as Wu Weiquan (吴蔚全)
 Head of the central courtyard, grandfather of Wu Yujin, Wu Yulin and Wu Yucheng. A strong believer of feng shui. Initially thinking that Zhou Ying's appearance is a bad omen, he later respects her for her integrity and talent in business.

Wu family associates

 Liu Peiqi as Zhou Laosi (周老四)
 Zhou Ying's trickster adoptive father who has a kind heart, and helps his daughter in every way possible.
 Niki Chow as Qianhong (千红)
 A singer from the city's largest dance house who has emotional entanglements with Shen Xingyi. She is proud and sharp-tongued, and later helps Zhou Ying in her business ventures. Han Sanchun's wife.
 Wang Haoyu as Han Sanchun (韩三春)
 Former leader of the Sanshou Clique, eventually becomes Zhou Ying's security chief. Qianhong's husband.
 Gao Haipeng as Treasurer Tong (佟掌柜)
 Took part in framing the Wu family.
 Li Zefeng as Wang Shijun (王世均)
 Head steward of the eastern courtyard. He has an unrequited love for Zhou Ying, yet is willing to become her capable assistant and assist her in reviving the Wu family business.
 Gao Yuan as Jiang Fuqi (江福祺)
 Accountant of the eastern courtyard.
 Wang Yimeng as Xiao Wu (小伍)
 Xu Fangyi as Chunxing (春杏)
 Zhou Ying's loyal maid and closest confidante.
 Sun Yan as Sun Yongquan (孙永泉)
 Liu Wan'er's cousin.

Others

 Shen Baoping as Hu Zhicun (胡志存)
 Hu Yongmei's father.
 Li Yike as Zhakun (查坤)
 Du Mingli's personal guard.
 Archie Kao as Tu'erdan (图尔丹)
 A rich and powerful businessman from the border of western China, near Xinjiang who is in love with Zhou Ying.
 Shi Xiaoman as Aisin Gioro Zaiyi (载漪)
 Guangxu Emperor's cousin.
 Xi Meijuan as Empress Dowager Cixi (慈禧)
 She later escapes to Jingyang, and stays at the Wu Residence.
 Zhou Rui as Aisin Gioro Zaitian (载湉)
 Guangxu Emperor

Soundtrack

Reception

Critical response 
The show was commercially successful, and dominated the television ratings throughout its run. Initially it generated much positive reviews and discussion on micro-blog site Weibo and popular review site Douban. However, halfway through its run, there have been complaints about inconsistent writing, the number of unnecessary character deaths, illogical business transactions and the female lead's excessive number of love interests, which ultimately left the drama with a 7.6/10 rating. Despite the negative reviews surrounding the story line, there has been near universal praise for the acting, directing and production values.

Ratings 

 Highest ratings are marked in red, lowest ratings are marked in blue

Awards and nominations

References

External links
 Nothing Gold Can Stay on Sina Weibo

Chinese historical television series
2017 Chinese television series debuts
Jiangsu Television original programming
Dragon Television original programming
Television series set in the Qing dynasty
Monarchy in fiction
Cultural depictions of Empress Dowager Cixi